Oreobolus is a genus of flowering plants in the family Cyperaceae. The genus has a circumpacific distribution.

References

 
Cyperaceae genera